The Mason–Weaver equation (named after Max Mason and Warren Weaver) describes the sedimentation and diffusion of solutes under a uniform force, usually a gravitational field. Assuming that the gravitational field is aligned in the z direction (Fig. 1), the Mason–Weaver equation may be written

where t is the time, c is the solute concentration (moles per unit length in the z-direction), and the parameters D, s, and g represent the solute diffusion constant, sedimentation coefficient and the (presumed constant) acceleration of gravity, respectively.

The Mason–Weaver equation is complemented by the boundary conditions 

These boundary conditions correspond to the physical requirement that no solute pass through the top and bottom of the cell, i.e., that the flux there be zero. The cell is assumed to be rectangular and aligned with 
the Cartesian axes (Fig. 1), so that the net flux through the side walls is likewise 
zero.  Hence, the total amount of solute in the cell

is conserved, i.e., .

Derivation of the Mason–Weaver equation

A typical particle of mass m moving with vertical velocity v is acted upon by three forces (Fig. 1): the 
At equilibrium (typically reached in roughly 10 ns for molecular solutes), the 
particle attains a terminal velocity  where the three forces are balanced.  Since V equals the particle mass m times its partial specific volume , the equilibrium condition may be written as

where  is the buoyant mass.

We define the Mason–Weaver sedimentation coefficient .  Since the drag coefficient f is related to the diffusion constant D by the Einstein relation

,

the ratio of s and D equals

where  is the Boltzmann constant and T is the temperature in kelvins.

The flux J at any point is given by

The first term describes the flux due to diffusion down a concentration gradient, whereas the second term 
describes the convective flux due to the average velocity  of the particles.  A positive net flux out of a small volume produces a negative change in the local concentration within that volume

Substituting the equation for the flux J produces the Mason–Weaver equation

The dimensionless Mason–Weaver equation

The parameters D, s and g determine a length scale 

and a time scale 

subject to the boundary conditions

at the top and bottom of the cell,  and 
, respectively.

Solution of the Mason–Weaver equation

This partial differential equation may be solved by separation of variables.  Defining , we obtain two ordinary differential equations coupled by a constant 

Since the T equation has the solution , where  is a constant, the Mason–Weaver equation is reduced to solving for the function .

The ordinary differential equation for P and its boundary conditions satisfy the criteria
for a Sturm–Liouville problem, from which several conclusions follow.  First, there is a discrete set of orthonormal eigenfunctions 
  that satisfy the ordinary differential equation and boundary conditions.  Second, the corresponding eigenvalues  are real, bounded below by a lowest 
eigenvalue  and grow asymptotically like  where the nonnegative integer k is the rank of the eigenvalue.  (In our case, the lowest eigenvalue is zero, corresponding to the equilibrium solution.)  Third, the eigenfunctions form a complete set; any solution for  can be expressed as a weighted sum of the eigenfunctions

where  are constant coefficients determined from the initial distribution 

At equilibrium,  (by definition) and the equilibrium concentration distribution is

which agrees with the Boltzmann distribution.

To find the non-equilibrium values of the eigenvalues , we proceed as follows.  The P equation has the form of a simple harmonic oscillator with solutions  where

Only one purely imaginary solution can satisfy the boundary conditions, namely, the equilibrium solution. Hence, the non-equilibrium eigenfunctions can be written as

By introducing the oscillator amplitude  and phase  as new variables,

the second-order equation for P is factored into two simple first-order equations

Therefore, we obtain an equation

giving an exact solution for the frequencies 

The eigenfrequencies  are positive as required, since , and comprise the set of harmonics of the fundamental frequency .   Finally, the eigenvalues  can be derived from 

Taken together, the non-equilibrium components of the solution correspond to a Fourier series decomposition of the initial concentration distribution 
multiplied by the weighting function .

See also
 Lamm equation
 The Archibald approach, and a simpler presentation of the basic physics of the Mason–Weaver equation than the original.

References

Laboratory techniques
Partial differential equations